Keluarga Cemara or Cemara's Family is a 2019 Indonesian family film adapted from the 1996 TV series of the same title by Arswendo Atmowiloto. The film stars Ringgo Agus Rahman, Nirina Zubir, Zara JKT48, and Widuri Putri Sasono as a family who is forced to live in a remote village following the patriarch's bankruptcy.

The film was released on 3 January 2019 to critical acclaim and gained a total of 1.699.433 audiences, becoming the seventh most-watched movie of the year. Two weeks after the film's release, it won six different categories on Piala Maya 2019, and later five on Piala Citra 2019 and Indonesian Movie Actors Awards 2019. A sequel was released in June 2022, followed by a televesion series.

Cast 

 Ringgo Agus Rahman as Abah
 Nirina Zubir as Emak
 Zara JKT48 as Euis
 Widuri Putri Sasono as Ara/Cemara
 Ariyo Wahab as Fajar
 Asri Welas as Ceu Salmah
 Joshia Frederico as Andi
 Kafin Sulthan as Deni
 Kawai Labiba M.A. as Ima
 Yasamin Jasem as Rindu
 Abdurrahman Arif as Kang Romly
 Maudy Koesnaedi as Tante Pressier
 Andrew Trigg as Luc
 Citra Ayu as Bianca
 Melati JKT48 as Via
 Eve JKT48 as Fika
 Vanka JKT48 as Diva

Development 
The film was announced on 4 January 2018 with Yandi Lauren as the director, starring Ringgo Agus Rahman, Nirina Zubir, Zara JKT48, and Widuri Putri Sasono. It premiered on 29 November 2018, before publicly released on 3 January 2019.

Following the film's success, Visinema Pictures announced the production of a sequel movie, with a television series centering on Zara JKT48's Euis will be released before the film. The sequel, titled Keluarga Cemara 2, was released in June 2022. Meanwhile, a television series is confirmed to be released on Disney+ Hotstar in September 2022.

References